The Côle is a  long river in the Dordogne département, south-central France. It rises near le Châtenet, a hamlet in Firbeix. It flows generally southwest. It is a left tributary of the Dronne into which it flows between Condat-sur-Trincou and Brantôme.

Communes along its course
This list is ordered from source to mouth: Firbeix, La Coquille, Mialet, Saint-Jory-de-Chalais, Saint-Romain-et-Saint-Clément, Thiviers, Saint-Jean-de-Côle, Saint-Pierre-de-Côle, La Chapelle-Faucher, Condat-sur-Trincou, Brantôme

References

Rivers of France
Rivers of Nouvelle-Aquitaine
Rivers of Dordogne